Derwyn Jones (born 14 November 1970, in Carmarthen, Wales) is a former professional Welsh rugby union player and Welsh international. He is the tallest Welsh player to be capped at 6 ft 10 inches tall, and weighed over 20 stone at his peak.

Career
Jones studied sports science at Loughborough University.

Jones made his international debut on Saturday, 26 November 1994 against South Africa in Cardiff aged 24 where Wales lost 20-12. He went on to play in 17 of the next 19 Internationals, earning nineteen caps for Wales. He was notably knocked unconscious from behind by Kobus Wiese at the beginning of a match against South Africa at Ellis Park Stadium in 1995. Wiese was fined and given a three-match ban.

At club level Jones won the SWALEC Cup twice in 1994 and 1997 and also played in the first Heineken Cup final with Cardiff in 1996.

Since retiring from active play, Jones has opened his own agency company, which represents over fifty elite rugby players across Europe.

Welsh International Record

1994 v South Africa (Cardiff) L 20-12
1995 v France (Paris) L 21-9 (FN)
1995 v England (Cardiff) L 23-9 (FN)
1995 v Scotland (Murrayfield) L 26-13 (FN)
1995 v Japan (Bloemfontein) W 57-10 (World Cup)
1995 v New Zealand (Johannesburg) L 34-9 (World Cup)
1995 v Ireland (Johannesburg) L 24-23 (World Cup)
1995 v South Africa (Johannesburg) L 40-11
1995 v Fiji (Cardiff) W 19-15
1996 v Italy (Rome) W 31-26
1996 v England (Twickenham) L 21-15 (FN)
1996 v Scotland (Cardiff) L 16-14 (FN)
1996 v Ireland (Dublin) L 30-17 (FN)
1996 v France (Cardiff) W 16-15 (FN)
1996 v Australia (Brisbane) L 56-25
1996 v Australia (Sydney) L 42-3
1996 v Barbarians (Cardiff) W 31-10
1996 v Italy (Rome) W 31-22
1996 v Australia (Cardiff) L 28-19

References

External links
http://www.sporting-heroes.net/rugby-heroes/displayhero.asp?HeroID=1936
https://web.archive.org/web/20061030052150/http://www.ospreysrugby.com/ospreys_news_view.php?news_id=340

1970 births
Living people
Loughborough Students RUFC players
People educated at Ysgol Gyfun Ystalyfera
Rugby union players from Carmarthen
Wales international rugby union players
Welsh rugby union players
Rugby union locks